

See also 
 United States House of Representatives elections, 1810 and 1811
 List of United States representatives from Delaware

1810
Delaware
United States House of Representatives